Troy Snyder (born November 24, 1965 in Reading, Pennsylvania) is a former U.S. soccer player who is second on the high school career scoring list with 208 goals and 117 assists.  He spent most of his career playing indoor soccer, but also won an outdoor title in 1987 with the San Diego Nomads.  Snyder earned five caps with the U.S. national team between 1985 and 1991 as well as another nine with the U.S. National Futsal Team.  In 1983, he was a member of the U.S. team at the U-20 World Championship.

Snyder is currently the president and part-owner of Reading United AC in USL League Two.

Player

Youth
Snyder attended Fleetwood Area High School in Fleetwood, Pennsylvania where he played as a forward on his school's soccer team.  During his high school soccer career, which ran from 1980 to 1983, he scored 208 goals and assisted on 117 others.  At the time, the 208 goals was a record, which has since been broken..  Following graduation from high school, Snyder attended Pennsylvania State University where he played for legendary coach Walter Bahr from 1984 to 1986.

Professional
In 1987, Snyder turned professional as a midfielder with the San Diego Nomads of the Western Soccer Alliance (WSA).  That season, the Nomads took the WSA title with a 3-1 win over the San Jose Earthquakes.  That winter, he signed with the Minnesota Strikers of the Major Indoor Soccer League (MISL).  The Strikers folded at the end of the 1987–1988 season.  Now out of a team, Snyder signed with the Dallas Sidekicks as a free agent.  He would go on to play four seasons and 210 games in Dallas.  In addition to playing for Dallas, Snyder spent the 1989 outdoor season with the Maryland Bays of the American Soccer League.

In 1992, Snyder left the Sidekicks and moved east to the Washington Warthogs of the Continental Indoor Soccer League (CISL).  He was recognized as the CISL Defender of the Year for the 1996–1997 season.  However, the Warthogs and the league folded at the end of that season and Snyder moved to the Baltimore Bays of the USISL.   He spent the 1997–1998 indoor USISL season with the Bays, winning the league championship before the team folded.  He then moved to the Baltimore Blast of the National Professional Soccer League (NPSL).

National team
In 1983, Snyder was selected for the United States U-20 men's national soccer team which competed at the U-20 World Championship.  The U.S. went 1-0-2 and failed to make the second round.  On June 15, 1985, the summer before his junior year of college,  Snyder earned his first cap in a 5-0 loss to England.  He was not called into the national team again until May 5, 1991 when he came on as a substitute for Janusz Michallik in a 1-0 win over Uruguay.  He played three more times that year, all as a substitute.  His last game with the national team came in a 2-0 win over Romania in Brașov.  In addition to his five caps with the outdoor national team, Snyder earned another nine caps, and scored one goal, with the United States national futsal team from 1987 to 1996.

References

External links
 Sidekicks profile
 MISL stats

1965 births
Living people
American men's futsal players
American soccer coaches
American soccer players
American Soccer League (1988–89) players
Baltimore Bays (1993–1998) players
Baltimore Blast (NPSL) players
Continental Indoor Soccer League players
Dallas Sidekicks (original MISL) players
Major Indoor Soccer League (1978–1992) players
Maryland Bays players
Minnesota Strikers (MISL) players
National Professional Soccer League (1984–2001) players
Parade High School All-Americans (boys' soccer)
Penn State Nittany Lions men's soccer players
Nomads Soccer Club players
Soccer players from Pennsylvania
United States men's international soccer players
USISL players
Washington Warthogs players
Western Soccer Alliance players
Association football utility players
People from Berks County, Pennsylvania
College men's soccer coaches in the United States
Sportspeople from Reading, Pennsylvania
Goucher College people